Szymon Kapias (born 12 June 1984 in Chorzów) is a Polish footballer who plays for Rozwój Katowice as a defender.

Career
He is a trainee of Ruch Chorzow. In January 2009 he joined Zagłębie Lubin.

References

Notes 
 

Polish footballers
1984 births
GKS Katowice players
Zagłębie Lubin players
Living people
Sportspeople from Chorzów
Association football defenders